American singer and dancer Normani has released one extended play, seven singles (including one as featured artist) and five music videos. In 2012, she auditioned as a solo artist for the second season of The X Factor. After being eliminated as a solo performer, Normani was brought back into the competition, along with four other girls, to form the girl band Fifth Harmony. During her time in the group, Normani and her bandmates released the albums Reflection (2015), 7/27 (2016), and Fifth Harmony (2017).

In early August 2017, Normani was featured as a cameo in R&B singer Khalid's music video for "Young Dumb & Broke". Two months later, it was announced that she had signed to management company S10 Entertainment as a solo artist. In February 2018, Normani and Khalid released the single "Love Lies", recorded for the soundtrack of the romantic teen film, Love, Simon. The single debuted at number 43 on the US Billboard Hot 100, scoring the highest first-week position for a single by a girl group member. It became a sleeper hit, reaching number nine after charting for 28 weeks.

In April 2018, it was announced that Normani had signed to Keep Cool/RCA Records for her solo debut album. In August 2018, Normani was featured on Jessie Reyez's remix of her single "Body Count" alongside Kehlani. In October 2018, she released the songs "Checklist" and "Slow Down" with Calvin Harris as part of the two-track EP Normani x Calvin Harris. She released the single "Waves" featuring 6lack in November 2018 after performing it at the Tidal X Brooklyn concert in October. In January 2019, Normani released "Dancing with a Stranger" with singer-songwriter Sam Smith. The song became the most-played song of 2019 on radio worldwide. Her single "Motivation" was released on August 16, 2019. Her single "Wild Side", featuring American rapper Cardi B, was released on July 16, 2021.

Extended plays

Singles

As lead artist

As featured artist

Other charted songs

Other appearances

Songwriting credits

Music videos

Guest appearances

References

Notes

Sources

External links
 

Discographies of American artists
Rhythm and blues discographies
Discography